Uthausen is a village and a former municipality in Wittenberg district in Saxony-Anhalt, Germany. Since 1 January 2010, it is part of the town Kemberg.

Geography 
Uthausen lies about 15 km southwest of Lutherstadt Wittenberg.

History 
Uthausen had its first documentary mention in 1308.

Regular events 
The Uthausen Tower Festival (Turmfest) is held yearly in early August.

Economy and transportation
Federal Highway (Bundesstraße) B 100 between Gräfenhainichen and Wittenberg runs straight through the municipality.

External links 
Verwaltungsgemeinschaft's website

Former municipalities in Saxony-Anhalt
Kemberg